The Runaway is the third album from London indie-rock band The Magic Numbers. The Stodart and Gannon siblings reveal a rather upbeat side on this offering, compared to their 2006 release Those the Brokes. The album features string arrangements by Robert Kirby (Nick Drake, Elvis Costello), who died in 2009, with The Runaway ultimately proving to be his final piece of work.

Track listing
All songs written by Romeo Stodart and Michele Stodart, except where noted.
 "The Pulse" (R. Stodart)
 "Hurt So Good" (R. Stodart) 
 "Why Did You Call?"
 "Once I Had"
 "A Start With No Ending" (R. Stodart) 
 "Throwing My Heart Away"
 "Restless River"
 "Only Seventeen"
 "Sound of Something"
 "The Song That No One Knows" (R. Stodart)
 "Dreams of a Revelation"
 "I’m Sorry"

Personnel
The Magic Numbers
Angela Gannon – melodica, percussion, Vocals, design
Sean Gannon – drums, design
Michele Stodart – bass guitar, keyboards, percussion, vocals, design
Romeo Stodart – guitar, piano, vocals, production, design

Singles
The first single "The Pulse" was released on 12 April 2010

Release details
A limited-edition of the album was released with an exclusive 4-track live EP which the band recorded at Wiltons Music Hall in London in January 2010.

2010 albums
Heavenly Recordings albums
The Magic Numbers albums
Albums arranged by Robert Kirby